The Telephone Girl is a farce musical comedy by C. M. S. McLellan (as Hugh Morton), with music by composer Gustave Kerker. The play made its New York debut at the Casino Theatre under the direction of George W. Lederer on December 27, 1897. Though not a favorite with the critics, The Telephone Girl would go on to have a successful run at the Casino and do well on subsequent road tours. The original New York cast starred Clara Lipman as ‘Estelle Cookoo’ and her real life husband, Louis Mann, as 'Hans Nix', roles assumed by  Mabel Hite and Harry Hermsen two years later during an extensive road tour of North America.

Plot
The Telephone Girl’ was taken from a French farce by Antony Mars and Maurice Desvallières, and revolves around a misunderstanding that occurs after Estelle Cookoo, a young French telephone operator, overhears a conversation between her boyfriend, Hans Nix, and a music hall actress he once knew.

Reception
The New York Times
 The Telephone Girl seemed courser and more vicious than any of its recent predecessors, but the seeming was largely due to the ineptness of the thing, its patches of dullness and deficiency of skill and charm in the performance. 

The Lima News
The Telephone Girl is one of his latest efforts in his peculiar line, and as seen last night it would seem that the gentleman (McLellan) has nearly reached the limit of the public’s tolerance of his Indecencies

Lebanon Daily News
At the Academy Wednesday Evening the medley is one of the most amusing sent from the New York Casino, and Louis Mann and Clara Lipman have won distinct favor in it.

Original New York Cast
Source: A History of the New York Stage by T. Allston Brown

Dick Marvel.. Edward Abeles
Velasquez.. Henry Bergman
Ebeneezer.. Nicholas Burnham
Mrs. Puffaway.. Rosa Cooke 
Col. William Goldtop.. Charles Dickson 
Saunders.. Benjamin T. Dillon 
Estelle Coocoo.. Clara Lipman 
Hans Nix.. Louis Mann
Snuffles.. James F. McDonald 
Samanthy Fairfax.. Sarah McVicker

References

1897 musicals
Broadway musicals
Broadway plays